James Savage was an American professional baseball pitcher who played for the Bacharach Giants, Baltimore Black Sox and Wilmington Potomacs of the Eastern Colored League in 1925.

Career
Born in Baltimore, Maryland, Savage played semi-pro baseball for several years before being recommended to the Bacharach Giants by Julio Rojo in late April 1925. 
A few weeks later, he was placed on waivers and claimed by the Baltimore Black Sox. By late May, he was acquired by the Wilmington Potomacs and appeared in at least one game against the Black Sox on May 27. He remained with the club until at least June.

References

External links
 and Seamheads

Year of birth missing
Year of death missing
Bacharach Giants players
Baltimore Black Sox players
Wilmington Potomacs players
Baseball pitchers